Jungle Cruise is a 2021 American fantasy adventure film directed by Jaume Collet-Serra from a screenplay written by Glenn Ficarra, John Requa, and Michael Green. It is based on Walt Disney's eponymous theme park attraction. Produced by Walt Disney Pictures, the film stars Dwayne Johnson, Emily Blunt, Édgar Ramírez, Jack Whitehall, Jesse Plemons, and Paul Giamatti. It tells the alternate history of the captain of a small riverboat who takes a scientist and her brother through a jungle in search of the Tree of Life while competing against a German expedition, and cursed conquistadors.

Plans for a feature film based on the Jungle Cruise ride began in 2004. The project lay dormant until 2011. The original version fell through and Johnson joined in 2015. Blunt and the rest of the cast joined in 2018 in a revamped version, with filming taking place in Hawaii and Georgia, from May, through September that year. The score was composed by James Newton Howard.

Following a year of post-production and a year of further delay due to the COVID-19 pandemic, Jungle Cruise was finally released in the United States on July 30, 2021, simultaneously in theaters and digitally through Disney+ with Premier Access. The film received mixed reviews from film critics and grossed $221 million worldwide against a production budget of $200 million, in addition to this it also grossed $66 million in its first 30 days Premier Access run making its overall revenue a little below 300 million. A sequel is in development, with Johnson and Blunt set to reprise their roles.

Plot
In 1556, Don Aguirre leads Spanish conquistadors to South America to search for the Lágrimas de Cristal Tree, whose flowers cure illness, heal injuries, and lift curses. After many conquistadors die, the Puka Michuna tribe heals the sickened survivors with the Tree's flowers. When the tribal chief refuses to reveal the Tree's location, Aguirre stabs him and burns the village. The dying chief curses the conquistadors, making them immortal and unable to leave sight of the Amazon River without being dragged back by the jungle itself.

In 1916 London, Dr. Lily Houghton's Tears of the Moon research is presented by her brother MacGregor to the Royal Society. The Houghtons, hoping to revolutionize both medicine and the British War Effort, request access to a recently acquired arrowhead artifact, but the request is denied as the Tree is considered a myth and female scientists are disfavored. However, believing the arrowhead and her old Amazon map are the key to finding the Tree, Lily steals it, narrowly evading Prince Joachim, who is equally intent on finding the Tree for Germany.

Arriving in Brazil, Lily and MacGregor search for a guide to navigate the Amazon River. They hire skipper Frank Wolff who offers jungle cruises embellished with faked theatrical dangers and corny puns. He initially declines, citing the dangers of the river and jungle, but reconsiders upon seeing the arrowhead. Frank steals back his repossessed boat engine from the harbormaster Nilo and the trio departs after escaping from Joachim's U-boat.

In Frank's cabin, Lily finds photos and sketches of modern inventions as well as research on the Tears of the Moon. She accuses him of seeking the Tree, but he insists he gave up long ago. They are captured by the Puka Michuna tribe, disguised as cannibals, but quickly release as they were hired by Frank. Angered, Lily begins to doubt Frank. The tribal chief Trader Sam translates the symbols on the arrowhead, revealing the Tree's location and that it only blooms under a blood moon.

Meanwhile, Joachim has located the conquistadors petrified inside a cave. He makes Aguirre agree to find the arrowhead for him in exchange for flowers. Joachim diverts the river to free them as Aguirre and his conquistadors are reanimated while fused with rainforest elements. The conquistadors track down and attack the tribe where Frank is stabbed through the heart by Aguirre. Lily flees with the artifact, but vines pull the conquistadors away when they unknowingly lose sight of the river while pursuing her.

To the Houghtons' amazement, Frank reappears alive. He reveals he is one of the cursed conquistadors, who once wanted to help find the Tears to save Aguirre's paralyzed daughter. However, he sided with the tribe against Aguirre's brutality. After years of endless fighting, he trapped his vengeful comrades away from the river's view, petrifying them. Failing to find the Tree, Frank became a tour guide and built a village.

Lily and Frank continue to La Luna Rota Waterfall and uncover a submerged temple. Meanwhile, Joachim has captured MacGregor and forces him to reveal Lily's location. Frank, the Houghtons, the Germans, and the conquistadors all converge at the Tree when La Luna Rota's water is partially drained.

Discovering the arrowhead is a locket with a red gem inside, Lily places the two pieces into carvings in the bark and the Tree briefly blooms under the blood moon. As a fight ensues, Lily recovers one flower. The German soldiers drown, Joachim is crushed by a falling rock, and Frank crashes his boat to block the river, petrifying himself and the rest of the conquistadors to save Lily. Realizing her true feelings for Frank, Lily sacrifices the flower to lift Frank's curse and restore his mortality, and he decides to leave the Amazon to be with her. The moon's last beam blooms a single flower, which Lily takes for research. Returning to the port, Frank sells his business to Nilo.

Upon their successful return to Britain, Lily becomes a full professor at the University of Cambridge. MacGregor rejects an invitation to membership from the Royal Society. Lily and Frank then explore London together as Lily teaches Frank how to drive a car.

Cast

 Dwayne Johnson as Frank Wolff / Francisco Lopez de Heredia:A shrewd and cynical but ultimately noble steamboat skipper who reluctantly agrees to guide two explorers on their quest for the mythical Tree. He eventually reveals his true name and identity as Aguirre's adopted brother and one of the cursed conquistadors, forever trapped by the Amazon River. He is a trained cartographer who has spent centuries searching for the Tree to break the curse that made him immortal so he can die peacefully. Meanwhile, he has built a town, and a boat he christened "La Quila" for his business under "Jungle Navigation Company" while owning a number of tamed exotic cats as a pet, each one named "Proxima".
 Emily Blunt as Dr. Lily Houghton:An eccentric, adventurous and virtuous botanist working in a male-dominated field, who hopes to find the Tree in order to harness its power for modern medicine. Possessing an ancient arrowhead and one of Frank's old maps of the Amazon, she proves she is resourceful and capable in martial arts and lock picking skills, despite the fact that she cannot swim until Frank helps her out with it at La Luna Rota. She wants to prove herself equal to her chauvinistic peers but gains some notoriety for wearing trousers.
 Édgar Ramírez as Aguirre:A Spanish conquistador who once sought the Tree's power to save his ill daughter, only to be cursed with immortality for his cruelty towards its guardians. Temporarily freed by German explorers, he sets out to take revenge on his adopted brother, Frank, for turning on him. His partially-decomposed body is now composed of an infestation of snakes and as such, he possesses the ability to convert part or all of his body into snakes.
 Jack Whitehall as MacGregor Houghton:Lily's younger brother who works as her assistant. He later confesses to Frank that the rest of their family all but disowned him after he was outed as being gay when he refused to marry a woman, prompting Lily to hire him so he could support himself and he has been loyal to her ever since. As a somewhat foppish snob who adheres to proper etiquette and prefers wearing three-piece suits, he seems ill-suited to jungle life, but gradually develops into a more confident, rugged man by the end of the expedition.
 Jesse Plemons as Prince Joachim:A deranged and ambitious German royal who finances and leads a military expedition with mercenaries to claim the Tree of Life, both to aid Germany's war effort and achieve immortality. He receives aid from the cursed conquistadors after he frees them for his own interest, and communicates with them through their bees and snakes.
 Paul Giamatti as Nilo Nemolato:The harbormaster at Nilo's River Adventure, Porto Velho, where Frank moors his boat. Nilo owns a Moluccan cockatoo named "Rosita". He is also a business rival, and confiscates Frank's boat engine when Frank is unable to repay him a loan with Rosita constantly quoting "Frank owes me money". This leads Frank to wreck Nilo's prize boats in return.

Additionally, Verónica Falcón plays Trader Sam, the female chief of the Puka Michuna tribe in 1916, who is a longtime friend of Frank's and knows about the curse. The Puka Michuna tribe has a centuries-long history of guarding the Tree, but Sam does not know the exact location herself until Lily shows her the arrowhead. Dan Dargan Carter, Dani Rovira, and Quim Gutiérrez play Aguirre's fellow conquistadors, as, respectively: Gonzalo, whose partially-decomposed body is composed of tree parts; Sancho, whose is composed of honeycombs and the colonies of honeybees that ride on him; and Melchor, whose is composed of mud and the poison dart frogs that ride on him. All the conquistadors have the ability to dissolve into their constituent parts to rapidly move through the jungle, as well as maintain telepathic control of the creatures inhabiting their bodies. Andy Nyman plays Sir James Hobbs-Coddington, the Royal Society's artifact handler who briefly helps Prince Joachim; while Raphael Alejandro plays Zaqueu, Frank's young assistant.

Other characters include the chief of the Puka Michuna tribe in 1556, played by Pedro Lopez, who cursed the conquistadors; and his daughter, played by Sulem Calderon, who protects the artifact away from the jungle. Also, stunt-actor Ben Jenkin was on set for the motion-capture of Proxima, Frank's devoted pet jaguar. She is one of a series of exotic cats rescued and trained by Frank that were all named Proxima (Spanish for "Next") in Frank's life. Out of fear and later affectionately, MacGregor nicknames her "Murder Cat".

References to the ride
Frank's puns are derived from the skipper's lines on the original theme park ride. Lily's personality is inspired by Indiana Jones. The boat is named after Mama Killa. The cockatoo — whose real name is "Lover Girl" — is named after the singing bird "Rosita" at Disneyland in the movie. The film has several elements referencing Dr. Albert Falls, a fictional character at Disneyland who has discovered Schweitzer Falls and has founded the Jungle Navigation Company.

Production

Early versions

In December 2004, it was announced that Jungle Cruise would be developed for Mandeville Films, with a script by Josh Goldstein and John Norville. Following the success of Pirates of the Caribbean, the film was announced to take place within the twentieth century and was loosely inspired by the theme park attraction of the same name which featured prominently in Disneyland's grand opening in 1955. In 2006, Alfred Gough and Miles Millar were in talks to write the film. In February 2011, it was announced that Tom Hanks and Tim Allen, who had previously worked together in the Toy Story franchise, would star in the long-gestating film, with a script to be written by Roger S. H. Schulman.

Pre-production

In August 2015, it was announced that Walt Disney Pictures was revamping the film adaptation to star Dwayne Johnson. The previous script originally written by Goldstein and Norville would be rewritten by John Requa and Glenn Ficarra with the intention to harken back to its period roots. John Davis and John Fox signed in as producers.

Johnson, who did a lot of research before getting into the role, announced in April 2017 that he would co-produce the film under his Seven Bucks Productions, and he expressed his interest in having Patty Jenkins helm the project. However, in July 2017, Jaume Collet-Serra was announced as the director of the film. In January 2018, Michael Green was reported to have rewritten the script, previously worked on by Patrick McKay and J.D. Payne. Also Emily Blunt signed on, as Johnson wanted her to be his co-star. Blunt was paid between $8–10 million for her involvement.

Casting

In March 2018, an open casting call was made for the other characters in the film, including men and women of all ethnicities between ages 17 to 90 and children between 6 and 14 years old.

In the same month, Jack Whitehall was cast as the brother of Blunt's character. Six months later, it was reported that he would have a coming out scene in the film with Johnson. This would be the second incidence of a gay character in a live-action Disney film, the first being Le Fou, portrayed by Josh Gad, in the 2017 adaptation of Beauty and the Beast. There was some backlash over the report, with some persons online expressing anger over a straight man being cast as a "camp" gay character.

In April 2018, Édgar Ramírez and Jesse Plemons were added to the cast as villains with the former being "a man with a conquistador background". In May, Paul Giamatti was cast to portray a "crusty harbormaster." In June, Quim Gutiérrez joined the cast to portray one of the villains. In July, it was announced that Veronica Falcón, Dani Rovira, and Andy Nyman had joined the cast. Before Falcón was cast as Trader Sam, a role inspired by a male character at the theme park, it was discussed whether the role would be a male or a female character in the film.

Filming
The first span of the shoot began on May 16, 2018, in Hawaii, where a port town was set up at Kapaia Reservoir, Kauai, near Wailua Falls. The set took one month to scout, two months to design, and four months to build, dress, and landscape while being challenged by the flood rains. Other shoot locations include the town of Lihue, the Kauai Plantation Railway, and Huleia Stream. After seven weeks, the shoot then moved for a major course at Blackhall Studios, Atlanta, where a pool was set up in a large tank like the river, as well as the jungle in it. Some scenes were also filmed at the Oxford College of Emory University.

Two boats of length "39 feet" were built for easy logistics in filming at both the locations, revealed production designer Jean-Vincent Puzos. Paco Delgado said that while some of the suits are original from the twentieth century, the costumes for the main characters and the tribals were specially made for the film, for which he researched the cultures of different tribes in the Amazon. He said that Amelia Earhart was the inspiration for Blunt's costume. Joel Harlow did make-up for 400 background characters to detail their appearance whether with a sunburn or an insect bite, also he made tattoo designs for 65 tribal characters. Tanoai Reed and Myles Humphus were Johnson's stunt doubles while Lauren Shaw was Blunt's.

The film cinematographer Flavio Martínez Labiano revealed that the blue screen technology was used. Magenta-tinted lights were used for a sequence of the tree. He also wanted to show colorful "London in the summer" unlike many other films which depict London in winter when "it's foggy and it's blue". Arri Alexa SXT Plus cameras were used, with specially designed Panavision C-Series anamorphic lenses. To shoot the underwater sequence, a puzzle set was built in the second tank, and then it was filled with water. Underwater cinematographer Ian Seabrook said that it took about two weeks to shoot simultaneously while the main cast was also busy shooting in the first tank, so the stunt doubles had to be present there too. He said that while Johnson was a strong swimmer, Blunt showed no fear despite being a novice in acting underwater. (In any case, the water tank had emergency exits for her to the right and the left of the camera.) The set had to be pulled out of the water by a crane so he handheld the camera throughout.

Filming wrapped on September 14, with about 95 days of principal photography. A few re-shoots took place before June 2019, which took three weeks in Atlanta. Johnson shared that the film pays homage to The African Queen, Romancing the Stone, and Indiana Jones.

Post-production
Ethan Van der Ryn and Erik Aadahl served as the sound designers, while Joel Negron served as the film editor, with DNEG, Industrial Light & Magic, Rodeo FX, Rising Sun Pictures, and Weta Digital providing the visual effects, along with The Third Floor. It took about a year in the post-production stage, but was shut down in March 2020 due to the pandemic, however, it resumed in the summer and was completed in September 2020.

After filming and before the post-production phase, the teams were sent to the Amazon rainforest, Brazil, and Costa Rica forest, where they recorded the actual surroundings, including "pristine wildlife and hundreds of species of exotic birds", so the background effects library can be created for the film, using different types of microphones, including ambisonic and parabolic. Two Alexa Minis, a drone, and several cameras were used for the reference photography and footage, which took about three weeks.

The port town, the water, and the jungle, all were built on a limited scale and were extended through CGI to create backgrounds. Plate shots were also captured at the Colorado River; these were used to animate the turbulent and aerated water, so the boat can be animated running at 200 km/h on the river as its journey is seen in the film. The 3D team made such effects like "light reflecting off the water, bugs flying around and dew glistening on leaves", so the film weather looks humid in the summer. The submarine was also digitally extended after it was shot in a tank. To visualize the explosions by torpedo, rubber and wooden structures were used.

To portray the character of Proxima, a stunt actor in a jaguar morphsuit, as well as a stuffed toy, were on set. To animate it for the film, a collection of plates from big cats was used with most references taken from a female jaguar in San Diego Zoo, before its 3D modeling and sculpting, with details like a mark on her forehead, a folded-over ear, and the muscle and skin system. Other animals were also observed to create its reaction to interactions. A pet cat also made an appearance as baby Proxima. In sequences of the pink river dolphins, each one was animated separately to build its own character, while the piranhas were also created with CGI.

To animate the conquistadors, each character was built with different body parts to make it not completely human. Materials were gathered to study the actual movements of the snakes for the animation, and the character was made serpentine; with sounds of the snake recorded from pressurized air releases. The frogs were recorded from Costa Rica forest for the mud guy, while honeycomb dripping sound was used for the beehive guy. The sounds of wood stress were used for the tree guy; whose character was completely animated except for some of his only facial expressions. Initially, there were ideas to explore more of the conquistadors with different characteristics, but these were settled on four only.

The scene for the Tree of Life was animated after taking inspiration from "Banyan trees, Baobabs, Angkor Wat and native South American trees" to give it an ancient look. The branches were made in higher resolution "to keep the Tree very organic and verging on gnarled". The tree growth and petal variations were observed, and lighting balance was considered, in order to animate the exposing and reverting luminosity of the petals after merging different shots; the sequence also contains fully-digital characters.

Most of the environmental surroundings and water elements were built and animated on Houdini, while the greenery was developed on SpeedTree.

Music

In January 2019, it was announced that James Newton Howard joined the production as the film score composer. By August 2020, it was revealed that Metallica collaborated with Howard on an instrumental version of the song "Nothing Else Matters", for the film. According to the band's drummer Lars Ulrich, Metallica worked on the film after Walt Disney Pictures president Sean Bailey felt like Jungle Cruise was "the right fit" for a collaboration between Disney and Metallica. Bailey had been "always looking for the right match where there was a way that Metallica could contribute to some Disney project". The band members recorded their parts from their individual studios, due to the COVID-19 pandemic.

The score was recorded in February 2020 by a 99-person orchestra, with vocals provided by 40 members from the Los Angeles Master Chorale. In order to add a "regional flavor", Howard incorporated panpipes and Brazilian percussion instruments. Frequent Metallica collaborator Greg Fidelman served as associate producer and engineer. The soundtrack album was released on July 30, 2021, by Walt Disney Records.

Release

Theatrical and streaming
Jungle Cruise had its world premiere at Disneyland Resort in Anaheim, California on July 24, 2021. It had a special screening on July 29, 2021, by D23 at El Capitan Theatre.

Initially, it was slated for October 11, 2019, before being moved to July 24, 2020, and was postponed due to the COVID-19 pandemic. In May 2021, Disney announced that the film would be released simultaneously in theaters and on Disney+ with Premier Access, due to the continued closure of theaters in markets like Brazil and Europe as the SARS-CoV-2 Delta variant surged. This is the last Disney+ Premier Access release to date, with Disney mostly instituting a 45-day exclusive theatrical window before coming to stream.

It was also released in India on September 24, and in China on November 12, 2021.

Home media
Jungle Cruise had a digital release on August 31 and it was released via 4K, Blu-ray, and DVD on November 16; this includes 16 minutes of 11 deleted scenes, and 6 bonus featurettes.

It debuted atop the "NPD Videoscan First Alert", ranking first in both the overall disc sales and Blu-ray sales. 55% of the sales came from Blu-ray, including 16% from 4K Blu-ray and 39% from traditional Blu-ray. The following week it was displaced to the second position by F9 due to the discounts offered around Black Friday, while ranking first on Redbox's rental charts. The third week saw it falling to the third rank in overall disc sales while retaining its position on the Redbox rental charts.

Reception

PVOD viewership
In its opening weekend, Disney reported the film made $30 million from worldwide Disney+ Premier sales, with Samba TV saying $23.3 million of it came from 770,000 U.S. households. Through its first 10 days of release, Samba reported the film had been streamed in 1.5 million households for a running domestic Premier Access gross of $44.98 million. By the end of its first 30 days, the viewership had grown to 2.2 million households for an estimated revenue of $66 million.

After its release on disc, the film topped Redbox's digital chart for two consecutive weeks. In the third week, it dropped to the fourth rank. In January 2022, tech firm Akami reported that Jungle Cruise was the tenth most pirated film of 2021.

Box office
Jungle Cruise grossed $117 million in the United States and Canada and $104 million in other territories for a worldwide total of $221 million. With an estimated combined production and promotional cost of $362 million, the film needed to gross around $500 million worldwide in order to break-even.

In the United States and Canada, Jungle Cruise was released alongside Stillwater and The Green Knight. It was projected to gross around $25 million from 4,310 theaters. The film made $13.4 million on its first day, including $2.7 million from Thursday night previews. It went on to slightly over-perform, debuting at $35 million to top the box office. The opening was met with a polarized response from industry insiders with some noting the film managed to finish above projections while others blamed the pandemic and simultaneous digital release for eating into possible grosses with one financial insider telling Deadline Hollywood that "the model diminishes the aggregate streaming revenue as well as cuts into a movie's theatrical gross." In its second weekend, the film fell 55% to $15.7 million, finishing second behind newcomer The Suicide Squad. The film made $9 million in its third weekend, $6.2 million in its fourth, and $5 million in its fifth.

In other territories, the film debuted at $27.6 million from 47 markets, below its $40 million projections. Its largest markets were the UK ($3.2 million), France ($1.6 million), and South Korea ($1.2 million). In its second weekend, the film made $15.1 million from 49 markets, with the top running-totals being from the UK ($8.5 million), Russia ($5.9 million), France ($4.2 million), Japan ($4 million), and Saudi Arabia ($2.7 million). In China it earned $3.3 million during its debut weekend, ranking fifth on the box office charts. This was considered a disappointing opening by media outlets. In the following weekend, it fell to the seventh rank.

Critical response
  Audiences polled by CinemaScore gave the film an average grade of "A−" on an A+ to F scale, while PostTrak reported that 80% of audience members gave it a positive score, with 60% saying they would definitely recommend it.

Writing for Variety, Owen Gleiberman praised Johnson and Blunt's chemistry and said that the film is "a little good old-fashioned" and it "pelts the audience with entertainment in such a lively yet bumptious way that at times you may wish you were wearing protective gear." Korey Coleman and Martin Thomas of Double Toasted both gave it a relatively positive review; even going so far as to predict that other critics would negatively critique it simply because of its premise. However, they were both split on the portrayal of Jack Whitehall's character; while Thomas found it as a positive step forward for LGBT characters, Coleman found it somewhat campy and unnecessary.

Rolling Stone reviewer David Fear gave the film 2.5/5 stars and called it an "attempt to sell the Magic Kingdom's vintage" boat ride as "the next big endless-summer-movie thing", adding that "Blunt's tart apple crisp of a comic performance pairs nicely with Johnson's beefcake served with a side of ham." In The New York Times, Jeannette Catsoulis wrote a negative review that the film is a "soggy mess" with a "mostly unintelligible" plot, adding that it "exhibits a blatantly faux exoticism that feels as flat as the forced frisson between its two leads". Writing for ABC News, reviewer Peter Travers commented that "made up of spare parts from better movies and at over two-hours in length", the film will be "tough on short attention spans"; however, he added that it is "better than Haunted Mansion and Tomorrowland", other films based on Disney rides.

Accolades

Sequel
After the release weekend of Jungle Cruise, Dwayne Johnson announced that discussions were underway with Walt Disney Pictures for a sequel, which could answer many questions left behind in the film. On August 30, 2021, it was reported that Johnson and Blunt were set to reprise their roles in the sequel. Michael Green is developing the script, with Jaume Collet-Serra expected to return as the director while John Davis, John Fox, Beau Flynn, Johnson, Dany Garcia, and Hiram Garcia return to produce with Scott Sheldon returning as executive producer. Johnson later confirmed a sequel was in development on that same day via a video posted on his official Instagram account. Garcia shared that Johnson and Blunt both have many ideas to explore more of their characters in the sequel. In October 2022, producer Beau Flynn confirmed that work on the script is ongoing, while also stating that Johnson and Blunt are more determined to make sure that a sequel happens, though they could not state when it will be made.

Additional notes

See also
 List of film adaptations of Disney attractions

References

External links
 
 
 
 

2020s adventure comedy films
2020s American films
2020s English-language films
2020s fantasy adventure films
2020s fantasy comedy films
2021 3D films
2021 adventure films
2021 comedy films
2021 fantasy films
2021 LGBT-related films
4DX films
Alternate history films
American 3D films
American adventure comedy films
American children's comedy films
American fantasy adventure films
American fantasy comedy films
American LGBT-related films
American World War I films
Casting controversies in film
Davis Entertainment films
Disney controversies
Films about curses
Films about immortality
Films about siblings
Films based on amusement park attractions
Films directed by Jaume Collet-Serra
Films postponed due to the COVID-19 pandemic
Films produced by Beau Flynn
Films produced by Dwayne Johnson
Films produced by John Davis
Films scored by James Newton Howard
Films set in 1916
Films set in Brazil
Films set in London
Films set in the 1550s
Films set in the Amazon
Films set on boats
Films shot in Atlanta
Films shot in Hawaii
Films with Disney+ Premier Access
Films with screenplays by Michael Green (writer)
Gay-related films
IMAX films
Jungle adventure films
LGBT-related controversies in film
River adventure films
Seven Bucks Productions films
Treasure hunt films
Walt Disney Pictures films